The XVII Army Corps was an army corps of the Royal Italian Army during World War II.

History  
On 11 November 1938 the Armored Corps (Corpo d'Armata Corazzato) was created in Mantua, with the motorized divisions "Po", "Trento" and the I and II Armored Brigades.
On 1 March 1941, the Armored Corps was part of the reserve Army of the Po, renamed XVII Army Corps and transferred to Albania on 4 April, in anticipation of operations against Yugoslavia. 
It then participated in the invasion of Yugoslavia (6–18 April 1941), where it conquered Dubrovnik, Podgorica and Trebinje. 

After returning to Italy on 16 June 1941, the Corps assumed responsibility for the territorial defense of Lazio, from the borders of Tuscany to the mouth of the Garigliano river. It remained here until the Armistice of Cassibile in September 1943, when it was disarmed by the Germans in Velletri and dissolved on 9 September.

Commanders 
 Armored Corps 
 Fidenzio Dall'Ora (11.11.1938 – 25.07.1940)
 Giuseppe Pafundi (25.07.1940 - 01.03.1941)
 XVII Army Corps
 Giuseppe Pafundi (01.03.1941 - 01.05.1941)
 Vittorio Sogno (02.05.1941 - 02.11.1941)
 Alberto Barbieri (03.11.1941 - 14.07.1943)
 Giovanni Zanghieri (15.07.1943 - 09.09.1943)

Notes

References

 

Army corps of Italy in World War II